The 1986 European Figure Skating Championships was a senior-level international competition held in Copenhagen, Denmark from January 28 to February 2, 1986. Elite skaters from European ISU member nations competed in the disciplines of men's singles, ladies' singles, pair skating, and ice dancing.

Competition notes
Jozef Sabovcik of Czechoslovakia landed a quadruple toe loop. It was recognized at the event but then ruled invalid three weeks later due to a touchdown with his free foot.

Results

Men

Ladies

Pairs

Ice dancing

References

External links
 results

European Figure Skating Championships, 1986
European Figure Skating Championships, 1986
European Figure Skating Championships
International figure skating competitions hosted by Denmark
1980s in Copenhagen
International sports competitions in Copenhagen
January 1986 sports events in Europe
February 1986 sports events in Europe